B. terrestris may refer to:

 Blepharospora terrestris, a plant pathogen species
 Bombus terrestris, a bumblebee species
 Brodiaea terrestris, a plant species
 Bufo terrestris, a toad species

See also
 Terrestris